David of Ashby (fl. 1260 – 1275) was an English-born Dominican friar who was sent from the Holy Land city of Acre to the Mongol ruler Hulagu in 1260, by the Papal legate Thomas Agni de Lentino. He stayed around 15 years among the Mongols, and only returned from Iran in 1274.

David of Ashby was a member of the Mongol embassy to the Second Council of Lyon in 1274, sent by Abaqa. The embassy arrived on 5 July 1274. David was accompanied by the clerk Rychaldus, in the service of the Mongols, and 14 Mongol dignitaries. The leader of the Mongols underwent baptism on this occasion, on 16 July.

David of Ashby wrote a book Les fais des Tatars ("The facts about the Tartars") describing the culture of the Tatars and their remarkable military organization and discipline.

See also
Franco-Mongol alliance

Notes

References
Demurger, Alain (2007). Jacques de Molay (in French). Editions Payot&Rivages. .
Grousset, René (1935). Histoire des Croisades III, 1188-1291 (in French). Editions Perrin. 
Jackson, Peter (2005). The Mongols and the West: 1221–1410. Longman. .
Richard, Jean (1996). Histoire des Croisades. Fayard. 
Roux, Jean-Paul (1993). Histoire de l'Empire Mongol. Fayard. 

13th-century English people
English Dominicans
13th-century English writers